{{DISPLAYTITLE:C16H13ClN2O}}
The molecular formula C16H13ClN2O (molar mass: 284.74 g/mol, exact mass: 284.0716 u) may refer to:

 Diazepam
 Mazindol

Molecular formulas